Badis ruber is a species of freshwater ray-finned fish from the family Badidae. It is found in Mekong, Salween and Irrawaddy basins in China, Laos and Thailand. This species grows to a length of 5.0 cm (2.0 in).

References

Fish of Thailand
Fish of Laos
Fish described in 1923
Badidae